The Four Mothers Society or Four Mothers Nation is a religious, political, and traditionalist organization of Muscogee Creek, Cherokee, Choctaw and Chickasaw people, as well as the Natchez people enrolled in these tribes, in Oklahoma. It was formed in the 1890s as an opposition movement to the allotment policies of the Dawes Commission and various US Congressional acts of the period. The society is religious in nature. It opposed allotment because dividing tribal communal lands attacked the basis of their culture. In addition, some communal lands would be declared surplus and likely sold to non-Natives, causing the loss of their lands.

There were more than 24,000 members at the organization's peak.

Background 

The Four Mothers Societies may have existed, although undocumented, for much of the 19th century. It was formally founded as a dues-collecting organization about 1895 in Sulphur Springs, Indian Territory. It continued in this legal incarnation until 1915, and likely much later. The naming is significant as Cherokee mothers are believed to be from Selu, the Corn Mother. The name may also refer to the four directions, which are integral to religious thought and practice.

With the passage of the Curtis Act in 1898 and Dawes Act, allotment became US policy. The various tribal governments were forced to agree to allotment and their members were registered to establish heads of household. Many members of the Four Mothers Societies were outraged that communal lands were being broken up and allocated to households. 

Chitto Harjo set up a new Creek government in Henryetta, which many Creek who opposed allotment acknowledged as the legitimate government. In 1900 Harjo's followers held a meeting was held at Hickory ceremonial grounds; they declared that Pleasant Porter and his government had violated the 1867 Creek Constitution. They declared Porter's government invalid and declared Harjo to be the new principal chief.

Redbird Smith, a traditionalist and founder of the Nighthawk Keetoowah Society, also became involved in the Four Mothers Society.

In 1906, the group submitted a petition of one hundred eighty-six signatures to Congress, so that a delegation could be sent to Washington, D.C. to discuss treaty violations and their concerns over official tribal leadership. Harjo spoke before the Senate, supported by the Four Mothers Nation.

The Four Mothers Society was also associated with the movement for a State of Sequoyah. Rather than agreeing to merge with Oklahoma Territory and apply for admission to the Union, they proposed a state to be set aside for Native Americans.

Besides openly opposing allotment, the Four Mothers Societies maintain ceremonial groups for stomp dances, stickball games, feasts, meetings, and ceremonies. In the late 1980s the Chickasaw had at least one dance ground and the Cherokee another . Today in the early 21st century, there are several Four Mothers Society grounds throughout eastern Oklahoma.

As of 2015, several Muscogee (Creek) ceremonial grounds are still active, and the Cherokee also have an active ground.

Representation in other media 
Author LeAnne Howe (Creek) refers to the Four Mothers Society in her novels in the context of traditional matriarchal culture. She explores it at length in her book Miko Kings.

See also 
 Black drink
 Green corn ceremony
 Coosa
 Keetoowah Nighthawk Society

References

Further reading 
 

Native American rights organizations
Indigenous topics of the Southeastern Woodlands
Native American religion
Cherokee culture
Chickasaw
Choctaw culture
Muscogee culture
Natchez
1890s in Oklahoma Territory